Adisumarmo International Airport  is an airport in Boyolali Regency, Central Java, Indonesia. It is located 14 km north of Surakarta city. It is the main airport of Boyolali and Surakarta and the surrounding area, also known as Greater Solo. The airport also serves as an alternative airport to Adisutjipto International Airport in Yogyakarta during a disaster, such as during the 2006 Yogyakarta earthquake and the 2010 Mount Merapi eruption.

The airport also serves as the base of the Indonesian Air Force which is known as Lanud Adisumarmo. However, the airport do not serve as a home base to any combat squadron of the Indonesian Air Force. Instead, it serves as the training institute for future Indonesian Air Force cadets. The airbase also oversee the air defense of Surakarta and the surrounding area.
Lion Air declared the airport as a regional hub in 2016.

History
The airport was formerly called Panasan Air Force Base, because it is located in Panasan area. The airport was built in 1940 by the Dutch Colonial Government as an emergency airstrip. During the Japanese invasion of the Dutch East Indies, the airport was destroyed by the Dutch to prevent it from being captured intact by the Japanese, but the Japanese military rebuilt it and it serves as a military base for the Imperial Japanese Navy Air Service. After the Independence of Indonesia, the airport continues to serve as a military airbase, this time for the Indonesian Air Force. The airbase was first used officially for commercial flights on 23 April 1974 served by Garuda Indonesia on the Jakarta-Solo & Solo-Jakarta route with a frequency of 3-times a week. On 25 July 1977, the airport changed its name to Adi Sumarmo Airport, which was taken from the name of Adisumarmo Wiryokusumo, the younger brother of Augustinus Adisucipto. Together, they are known as the pioneer of the Indonesian Air Force.

On 31 March 1989, the airport was designated an International Airport by serving Solo-Kuala Lumpur & Solo-Singapore flight routes. On 1 January 1992, the airport was handed to Angkasa Pura I. On 28 January 2008, the airport was closed to all commercial traffic for several hours while the body of former Indonesian President Suharto was transported from Jakarta's Halim Perdanakusuma International Airport. 

On 2016, Lion Air makes Adisumarmo International Airport as one of its hub in its flight connectivity. It aims to develop service routes from Central Java, especially from Solo to various cities both in the country and abroad. There are 5 domestic flight routes that opened from and to Solo, among others, from and to Banjarmasin, Lombok, Palangkaraya, Makassar, and Pontianak. Lion Air will make several additional services such as, adding new routes from and to the city of Solo and the addition of frequencies of existing flight routes.

Terminal 
On 2 March 2009, a new terminal began operation which has more capacity than the old terminal. The new terminal is located to the north of the old terminal which belongs to the Air Force. The new terminal is built on an area of 13,000 square meters. The old terminal complex is only 4,000 square meters. The new terminal has parking facilities for nine narrow-body aircraft like the Boeing 737 Classic or three wide body planes and three narrow body planes. The terminal has three aerobridges with five gates. The airport is able to serve wide body jet like Airbus A330, Boeing 747, and Boeing 777. The Airbus A330 is usually operated for Hajj flights in Hajj season or for some extra flight in Ramadan season. The airport terminal has minimarkets (Circle K and Indomaret), food counters, shopping area and some food counters near the boarding lounge.

The old passenger terminal is now used for VIP flights.

Airlines and destinations

Passenger

Statistics

Ground transportation

Bus
Perum DAMRI operates airport shuttle buses that serve several destination from Adisumarmo Airport.

Since May 2011, Batik Solo Trans buses also connects the airport to the city.

Car and taxi
Various taxi and shuttle services are provided by numerous service providers.

Train 

The 13.5-kilometer airport rail connects from Solo Balapan Station to Adi Soemarmo Airport. Construction of the airport rail line consists of two segments, namely segment 1, ranging from Solo Balapan Station to Solo Baru Station along 3.5 km which is the existing railway track. Meanwhile, segment 2, starting from Solo Baru Station to Adi Sumarmo Airport along the 10 km to be built new railway line. The presence of the airport train is one of the government's efforts to realize the integration between public transport modes and meet the needs of community mobilization, and to create safe, secure, convenient and timely transportation facilities. The airport train is formally launched on December 29, 2019. By using the airport train, the distance from Solo to Adi Sumarmo Airport will only take in 19 minutes and 27 minutes from the airport to the city with headway 40 minutes. This is the first airport train in Indonesia connects city directly to departure hall in the airport and faster than using a car which usually takes 40 to 60 minutes.

Incidents
 On 30 November 2004, Lion Air Flight 538 overran the runway after landing in bad weather. 25 people on board were killed.

References

External links
Adisumarmo International Airport - Indonesia Airport Global Website

Boyolali Regency
Airports in Central Java
Transport in Central Java
Indonesian Air Force bases